Matt in 13 Zügen is a German television series.

See also
List of German television series

External links
 

1984 German television series debuts
1984 German television series endings
German crime television series
German-language television shows
Das Erste original programming